Domingo Elizondo (c. 1710 - died 1 June 1783, Madrid) was a Spanish soldier from Navarre who lived in the late 18th century.

Information
Before América, he fought in the battlefields of Italia during the War of the Austrian Succession (1740–48) and Seven Years' War (1756-1763).
But his main field of action was New Spain, where he fought against the Seris and the Pimas, Indian tribes of Sonora, in México and Southern Arizona in the United States, between 1767 and 1771. He published a book about his experiences in the region.

References

1710 births
1783 deaths
Year of birth uncertain
Spanish explorers
18th-century Spanish military personnel